Ninnis may refer to:

 Ninnis Glacier
 Mertz-Ninnis Valley
 Belgrave Edward Sutton Ninnis (1887–1912), British Army officer and Antarctic explorer
 Belgrave Ninnis (1837–1922), Royal Navy surgeon, pioneer of Northern Australia, surveyor, Arctic explorer, and Freemason
 Scott Ninnis (born 1965), Australian basketball player

See also 
 Ninni, a given name